Georges Aperghis (born 23 December 1945) is a Greek composer working primarily in the field of experimental music theater but has also composed a large amount of non-programmatic chamber music. He lives in France and was married to actress Édith Scob until 2019 when he died.

Aperghis studied with Iannis Xenakis and founded the music and theater company ATEM (Atelier Théâtre et Musique). He was a "composer in residence" in Strasbourg, France.

In 2011 he was the first recipient of the Mauricio Kagel Music Prize. Aperghis is honored with the 2015 BBVA Foundation Frontiers of Knowledge Award in Contemporary Music for his reinvention of music theater, using sound, gesture, space and technology and involving performers in the compositional process.

Selected works

 Il gigante Golia (1975/1990) for voice and orchestra
 Histoire de loups (1976), opera
 Récitations (1977–78) for solo voice
 Le Corps à Corps (1978) for solo percussion (voice with Zarb)
 En un tournemain (1987) for viola solo
 Cinq Couplets (1988) for voice and bass clarinet
 Triangle carré (1989) for string quartet and three percussionists
 Simulacre (1991–95), series of four pieces for voice and small chamber groupings
 Sextuor: L'Origine des espèces (1992), opera for five female voices and 'cello
 Crosswind (1997) for viola and saxophone quartet
 Volte-face (1997) for viola solo
 Machinations (2000) musical spectacle for four female voices and computer
 Die Hamletmaschine-oratorio (2000) for choir and orchestra with soloists
 Le petit chaperon rouge (2001) for chamber ensemble
 Rasch (2001) for violin and viola
 Avis de tempête (2005), opera with chamber ensemble and electronics
 Trio Funambules (2014), for saxophone, piano and percussion (written for Trio Accanto)

External links
 
 The Banff Center: Who the H... is Georges Aperghis? Biography
 
 The online music review La Folia has review articles about Aperghis: Further Aperghis Sightings, Ictus Rocks: New Romitelli and Aperghis on Cyprès and Georges Aperghis and Die Hamletmaschine

Listening
UbuWeb Sound Poetry: George Aperghis featuring Récitations for solo voice 1977-1978

1945 births
Living people
21st-century classical composers
Greek classical composers
Male classical composers
21st-century male musicians
Musicians from Athens